Rikita Nandini Shimu is a Bangladeshi actress, acted in films of many notable filmmakers as Tareque Masud, Rubaiyat Hossain and Aditya Vikram Sengupta. She received the Best Actress Award at Festival de Saint-Jean-de-Luz, in France for her lead role in 2019 film Made in Bangladesh.

References

Bangladeshi actresses
Living people
Year of birth missing (living people)